Member of Provincial Parliament is the title given to provincial legislators in two legislatures:
 Member of Provincial Parliament (Canada)
 Member of Provincial Parliament (Western Cape)